Rosanna Diane Davison (born 17 April 1984) is an Irish actress, singer, writer, model and beauty queen who was crowned Miss World 2003. She is the daughter of musician Chris de Burgh, and the song "For Rosanna" was written by her father for his 1986 album, Into the Light in her honour. Davison is a qualified nutritional therapist and promotes the health benefits of a plant-based diet.

Education

Born in County Dublin, Ireland, Davison's primary school education was at Aravon School, in County Wicklow. She then attended Rathdown School in Glenageary, County Dublin. She was class prefect before graduating and completing her leaving certificate examinations in 2002.

Miss World
In August 2003, she entered the Miss Ireland finals in Dublin, and winning the competition, found herself competing for the title of Miss World. December 2003 saw Davison, along with 106 other contestants, compete in the Miss World competition in Sanya, China. Rosanna went on to win the crown and is the first Irish entrant to win the Miss World title since it started in 1951. During Davison's reign, she visited the United Kingdom, the United States, Canada, China, and Sri Lanka.

Modelling and film career

She is signed to Storm Model Management in the UK.

In February 2012, she came second in a poll to find Ireland's most desirable Valentines.

From October 2013, she started presenting slots on LFC TV, the dedicated television channel for Liverpool F.C.

Personal life

Davison has been in a relationship with Wesley Quirke since 2006. They were engaged in 2013 and wed in the summer of 2014. They had their honeymoon in the Seychelles. They have one daughter, and twin sons. 
 
She followed a vegetarian diet for more than a decade but transitioned to a vegan diet to propel training for the Galway Ironman, an event that consists of a half-marathon, 90-kilometre bike ride and 1.9-kilometre swim. In 2013, she posed naked in a PETA ad campaign promoting a vegan diet.

Davison is a graduate of the College of Naturopathic Medicine. She is a qualified nutritional therapist and obtained her MSc degree in personalised nutrition from Middlesex University. In February 2015 she signed a publishing deal with Gill Books for her first cookbook, Eat Yourself Beautiful, which was released in August 2015 and went on to be a best-seller. The book advocates plant-based nutrition. 

In 2019, Davison was criticized by vegan activists for taking part in a paid campaign for Naas Racecourse. In response, Davison has stated that she eats a plant-based diet for health reasons and has never claimed to be a vegan.

Filmography
 Harry Hill: An Audience with Harry Hill (2004)   
 Comic Relief: Red Nose Night Live 05 (2005)
 Miss Great Britain Final 2010 (2011)
 Ringsend (2017)
 The Wake (2017)

Selected publications

Eat Yourself Beautiful: True Beauty, From the Inside Out (2015)
Eat Yourself Fit: Make Your Workout Work Harder (2016)

References

1984 births
Living people
Actresses from County Dublin
Actresses from County Wicklow
Alumni of University College Dublin
Alumni of Middlesex University
Beauty pageant contestants from Ireland
Irish beauty pageant winners
Irish people of English descent
Irish women non-fiction writers
Miss Ireland winners
Miss World 2003 delegates
Miss World winners
Plant-based diet advocates
People from Glenageary
People educated at Rathdown School
Women nutritionists